Levana Finkelstein (born 21 September 1947) is an Israeli actress and sculptor. She has appeared in more than thirty films since 1969.

Selected filmography

References

External links 

1947 births
Living people
Actresses from Sofia
Actresses from Tel Aviv
People from Jaffa
Bulgarian Jews in Israel
Bulgarian emigrants to Israel
Israeli people of Bulgarian-Jewish descent
Beit Zvi School for the Performing Arts alumni
Jewish Israeli actresses
Israeli film actresses
Israeli television actresses
Israeli stage actresses
Israeli women sculptors
20th-century Israeli actresses
21st-century Israeli actresses